Paul Oldfield, better known by his stage name Mr Methane, is a British flatulist or "professional farter" who started performing in 1991. He briefly retired in 2006 but restarted in mid-2007. He claims to be the only performing farter in the world. He worked on the railways before focusing on his flatulence performances.

Background
According to When Will I Be Famous? (2003), a BBC book on British variety acts, Oldfield discovered his ability to fart on a whim at the age of fifteen when practicing yoga. The next day, eager to share his newfound ability, he performed twenty rapid-fire farts in under a minute for a group of his friends.

Oldfield is able to fart the notes of music in time and in tune and in the late 1980s, after years of work in the railway industry, Oldfield turned professional, performing as an opening act for the Macclesfield-based bands the Screaming Beavers and the Macc Lads. The latter wrote a song about him on their album The Beer Necessities. 

Oldfield subsequently travelled to New York City in the U.S., where he appeared as a guest on The Howard Stern Show as the "British Blaster". While in New York, Mr. Methane also performed a series of fart acts on Broadway.

In his autobiography, English comic Frank Skinner talks about the time that Phil Spector, while receiving a lifetime music award, went into a rant live on Australian TV about a duet of "Da Doo Ron Ron" that Skinner had sung with Mr Methane on his BBC1 chat show. Spector said that Methane and Skinner had taken his work of art and desecrated it.

In the 1990s, Mr Methane produced a parody of the Phil Collins song "In the Air Tonight" titled "Curry In the Air Tonight." Tony Smith, Collins' business manager, refused to let Mr Methane release his parody version, stating that, "This is a very serious song and we cannot see any reason for it to be taken so lightly." Letters between the two parties were reproduced on The Smoking Gun website.

In July 2004, Q magazine voted Mr Methane's album mr methane.com the second most bizarre album ever released in a Q special edition titled "The 150 Greatest Rock Lists Ever".

In 2009, Oldfield auditioned for Britain's Got Talent, where he announced his intention to "put the art into fart", but failed to make it through to the live finals. He gave a flatulist performance of the "Blue Danube" waltz and was "buzzed" out by all three judges — despite two of them, Piers Morgan and Amanda Holden, laughing uncontrollably, while Simon Cowell called him "a disgusting creature". He received negative reactions from some audience members, while others were seen to be in hysterics. That same year, Mr Methane also auditioned for Das Supertalent in Germany, but was eliminated in the semi-finals.

In 2013, Mr Methane performed in The World Farting Championships at Utajärvi, Finland, though he did not participate in the contest itself.

July 2014, saw Mr Methane release a fart app for Android devices. The app had originally been developed in 2010, for the iPhone, but was rejected by Apple. The app was retired in April 2019.

A former employee of National Rail, Oldfield resides in Macclesfield, England. His residence is officially referred to as Farting House.

In 2023, Mr Methane appeared on the YouTube channel Sidemen in a video named 'SIDEMEN TRY NOT TO MOVE CHALLENGE'.

DVDs
 Methane, Mr (2000), Mr Methane Lets Rip!

See also
 Flatulence humor
 Le Pétomane
 Roland the Farter
 Toilet humour

Books
 Featured in Jennings, Charles (1995). "Up North — Travels Beyond The Watford Gap". Abacus. . p. 51.
 Mentioned in Frank Skinner's Autobiography (2001). Frank Skinner by Frank Skinner. Century. . pp. 311–12.
 Chapter on Mr Methane in Kelner, Martin (2003). When Will I Be Famous. BBC Books. 
 Featured in Foster, Tim (2007). Superman's Pockets. FiveFootSix. 
 There is a lengthy chapter on Mr Methane called "The Man With the Singing Sphincter" in Jim Dawson's 2006 book Blame It on the Dog: A Modern History of the flatulence. Ten Speed Press 
 The British comedian Peter Kay remembered the time he worked with Mr Methane in his book, Saturday Night Peter (2009). Century. . Story starts bottom of p. 95.
 The British author Dougie Brimson writes about Mr Methane in the 'Famous flatuists' chapter of his book The Art of Fart: The joy of flatulence

References

Footnote
 Daily Telegraph (London), 17 March 2001
 Interview/feature in The Age (Australia), 20 March 2005
 Guardian G2 p. 14 http://www.guardian.co.uk/culture/2008/jul/23/edinburghfestival.comedy
 July 2004 The 150 Greatest Rock Lists, Q special edition in the UK and a MOJO special edition overseas, including the US. p. 6. mrmethane.com CD voted No2 in a chart of The 20 Most Bizarre Albums.
 Letters between Mr Methane and Tony Smith personal and business manager to Phil Collins regarding his refusal for Mr Methane to release a parody of "In The Air Tonight" http://www.thesmokinggun.com/documents/crime/mr-methane-deflated-0

External links
 
 

1966 births
Living people
20th-century British people
21st-century British people
Flatulists
Britain's Got Talent contestants
British entertainers
People from Macclesfield